Gyminda (false box) is a genus of flowering plants in the family Celastraceae.

Selected species
 Gyminda latifolia (Sw.) Urb.
 Gyminda orbicularis Borh. & Muniz

References

External links

 
Celastrales genera
Taxonomy articles created by Polbot